Frances Louise Long (born 7 September 1885 in Madison, Nebraska, died 17 March 1946 in Santa Barbara, California) was an American plant ecologist who worked in the fields of plant physiology and pollination.

Biography

Early life
Frances Long was born on September 7, 1885, in Madison, Nebraska.

Education
She received a Bachelor of Arts and a Bachelor of Science in 1906, from the University of Nebraska system. In 1914, she earned a Master of Arts from the University of Minnesota. In 1917, she completed a Doctor of Philosophy degree from the same institution.

Career
Long conducted research at prestigious institutions including: Carnegie Institution for Science where she began as a research associate studying plant science in 1917, the Alpine Laboratory at Tucson, and the Coastal Laboratory of Santa Barbara.

Distinctions
 American Association for the Advancement of Science - Member
 Ecological Society of America - Member 
 Botanical Society of America - Member
 American Society of Plant Physiologists - Member

Publications
Long's work has been featured in over 60 publications including:

 Rubber-Content of North American Plants (co-authored with Harvey M. Hall) - Carnegie Institution of Washington, 1921, Publication No.313, Press of Gibson Brothers Inc., Washington, D.C.

See also
American Association for the Advancement of Science
Carnegie Institution for Science

References

1885 births
1946 deaths
Scientists from Nebraska
People from Madison, Nebraska
Plant ecologists
University of Minnesota alumni
20th-century American women scientists
Women ecologists
American ecologists
20th-century American biologists
American women biologists
Plant physiologists